Soapstar Superchef was a cooking show on the ITV Network, where soap stars from Coronation Street, EastEnders, Emmerdale, Hollyoaks (and Hollyoaks: In the City) and Neighbours competed to be crowned "kings" or "queens" of the kitchen.

Their culinary efforts were judged by an expert panel of three judges. Each judge gave a mark out of ten, and the teams were able to gain extra points by answering questions about a short clip from their rivals' soap.

Each team cooked twice and their points from both episodes were added together and the two teams with the highest totals competed head-to-head to win the show.

The show was hosted by Richard Arnold, known as GMTV's TV critic, and Nicki Chapman, an English television presenter who also worked in the British pop music industry.

Mathew Bose and Hayley Tamaddon were crowned Soapstar Superchefs on Friday 13 April 2007.

Scores

Judges/Chefs

Gino D'Acampo
Keith Floyd
Jilly Goolden
Ken Hom
Jonathan Meades
Jean-Christophe Novelli

Merrilees Parker
Paul Rankin
Jay Rayner
Rosemary Shrager
Brian Turner
Antony Worrall Thompson

Anniversary list 
Soapstar Superchef 15th Anniversary (19 March 2022)

15 Years of Soapstar Superchef 
15 Years of Soapstar Superchef (19 March 2022)

References

2007 British television series debuts
2007 British television series endings
ITV (TV network) original programming
Television series by ITV Studios